Tapiravus is an extinct genus of herbivorous mammals that were related to tapirs of today.

References

Prehistoric tapirs
Prehistoric mammal genera